The Marriage of Mademoiselle Beulemans may refer to:

 The Marriage of Mademoiselle Beulemans (1927 film), a 1927 French silent comedy film
 The Marriage of Mademoiselle Beulemans (1932 film), a 1932 Belgian-French comedy film
 The Marriage of Mademoiselle Beulemans (1950 film), a 1950 Belgian-French comedy film